The Foundling Hospital was a hospital in Leitrim Street, Cork, Ireland.

History
Following a 1735 Act of the Irish Parliament which provided for hospitals being funded by a local tax on coal and culm, (a type of coal known as Anthracite), weigh-house fines, carriage car licenses and penalties on drivers of same, it was decided to establish a foundling hospital in Leitrim Street. The properties constructed, at a site now occupied by the Lady's Well or Murphy's Brewery, were based around a small quadrangle with a chapel, school-rooms, boys dormitories, girls dormitories, and staff apartments. The hospital opened in 1747. 

In 1821 the foundling hospital was governed by the Lord Bishop of Cork, the Mayor, Recorder, Aldermen, Sheriffs, and Common Council, Common Speaker, and 26 others annually chosen at the Court of D'Oyer Hundred. At this time the tax on coal was levied at one Shilling per ton of coal imported into Cork.

In Cork, the Union Workhouse was opened on Douglas Road in 1841. The Foundling Hospital at Leitrim Street subsequently closed in July 1855, when it was converted by the Emigration Commissioners for use as an Emigration depot.

See also
 Foundling hospital

References

External links

Hospitals in County Cork
Foundling Hospital
1747 establishments in Ireland
Organisations based in Cork (city)
Hospitals established in the 1740s
Buildings and structures in Cork (city)
Defunct hospitals in the Republic of Ireland